The 2013–14 season is FK Borac 4th season in Premier League of Bosnia and Herzegovina. This article shows player statistics and all matches (official and friendly) that the club have and will play during the 2013–14 season.

Players

Squad statistics

Top scorers
Includes all competitive matches. The list is sorted by shirt number when total goals are equal.

Transfers

In

Out

For recent transfers, see List of Bosnian football transfers summer 2013 and List of Bosnian football transfers winter 2013-14

Tournaments

Premier League of Bosnia and Herzegovina

League table

Results and positions by round

Matches

Republika Srpska Cup

Bosnia and Herzegovina Football Cup

Borac Banja Luka will participate in the 10th Bosnia and Herzegovina Football Cup starting in the Round of 32.

Friendlies

Borac Banja Luka
FK Borac Banja Luka seasons